What You Don't Know is the second studio album by American girl group Exposé, released on June 13, 1989, by Arista Records. It was made available in vinyl, cassette, and CD formats. The remixes of the tracks "What You Don't Know" and "When I Looked at Him" appeared only on the CD.

Five singles were released from this album. "What You Don't Know", "When I Looked at Him" and "Tell Me Why" all peaked within the top 10 of the Billboard Hot 100, at numbers 8, 10, and 9, respectively. "Your Baby Never Looked Good In Blue" peaked within the top 20 at number 17. "Stop, Listen, Look, & Think" was released solely to dance clubs and as a 12-inch single.

Track listing

Charts

Weekly charts

Year-end charts

Certifications

References

1989 albums
Exposé (group) albums